Dan Lucian Panait (born 16 February 1997) is a Romanian professional footballer who plays as a defender for Oțelul Galați. In his career, Panait also played for teams such as ASA 2013 Târgu Mureș, Concordia Chiajna or Farul Constanța, among others.

Honours
Chindia Târgoviște
Liga II: 2018–19

References

External links
 
 
 

1997 births
Living people
Sportspeople from Brăila
Romanian footballers
Romania youth international footballers
Association football defenders
Liga I players
FC Viitorul Constanța players
CS Concordia Chiajna players
Liga II players
ASA 2013 Târgu Mureș players
AFC Chindia Târgoviște players
FCV Farul Constanța players
FC Brașov (2021) players
ASC Oțelul Galați players